William Murphy was an American merchant from Briggsville, Wisconsin who served two one-year terms (1869 and 1874) as a Democratic member of the Wisconsin State Assembly from Marquette County, Wisconsin.

References 

Businesspeople from Wisconsin
Democratic Party members of the Wisconsin State Assembly
People from Briggsville, Wisconsin
Year of birth missing
Year of death missing